Rajesh Munat (born 29 April 1963) is an Indian politician and former PWD and cabinet minister of Government of Chhattisgarh. He is a member of Bharatiya Janata Party.

Political career 
Munat was elected to Vidhan Sabha in 2003 by defeating then PWD minister Tarun Chatterjee by a margin of 38,000 votes and became PWD minister in Raman Singh's Cabinet. He got an additional charge from the Ministry of School Education. After winning 2008 Assembly election, he became Minister of Urban Administration, Transport and Housing. Again, he remained Minister of Transport and Housing along with PWD from year 2013 to 2019.

References

External links
 Rajesh Munat official website

1963 births
Living people
Bharatiya Janata Party politicians from Chhattisgarh
Chhattisgarh MLAs 2003–2008
Chhattisgarh MLAs 2008–2013
Chhattisgarh MLAs 2013–2018
People from Mahasamund
People from Raipur, Chhattisgarh